Dan Gonzalez (born September 20, 1974) is a former American football quarterback who played two seasons with the Montreal Alouettes of the Canadian Football League. He played college football at East Carolina University and attended Neptune High School in Neptune, New Jersey. He was also a member of the Dallas Cowboys, Miami Dolphins and Amsterdam Admirals.

Early years
Gonzalez played high school football for the  Neptune High School Scarlet Fliers. He helped the Scarlet Fliers to playoff appearances his sophomore and senior years. Younger brother of the incomparable Gil Gonzalez, a 3-sport athlete for The College of New Jersey and current co-assistant defensive line coach for the Oakland Raiders Pop Warner League Pennsylvania All-Stars.

College career
Gonzalez played for the East Carolina Pirates from 1994 to 1997. He made his first start for the Pirates during his junior season in November 1996 in place of the injured Marcus Crandell. He recorded totals of 3,868 yards on 23 passing touchdowns during his college career. Gonzalez was redshirted in 1993.

Professional career
Gonzalez signed with the Dallas Cowboys after going undrafted in the 1998 NFL Draft. He was signed by the Miami Dolphins in 1998 and was allocated to NFL Europe in 1999, where he played for the Amsterdam Admirals. He played for the Montreal Alouettes from 2000 to 2001.

Coaching career
Gonzalez was later a coach at Indian River High School in Chesapeake, Virginia.

References

External links
 Just Sports Stats
 College stats

Living people
1974 births
American football quarterbacks
American players of Canadian football
Canadian football quarterbacks
Amsterdam Admirals players
East Carolina Pirates football players
Montreal Alouettes players
High school football coaches in Virginia
Neptune High School alumni
People from Neptune Township, New Jersey
Players of American football from New Jersey
Sportspeople from Monmouth County, New Jersey